The Samuel B. Conant House is an historic house in Central Falls, Rhode Island.  This -story structure was built in 1895 for Samuel Conant, president of a Pawtucket printing firm, and is one of the city's finest Colonial Revival houses.  Its exterior is brick on the first floor and clapboard above, beneath a gambrel roof punctured by several gable dormers.  The main facade has two symmetrical round bays, which rise to the roof and are topped by low balustrades.  A single-story porch extends between the center points of these bays, and is also topped by a low balustrade.

The house was listed on the National Register of Historic Places in 1979.

See also
National Register of Historic Places listings in Providence County, Rhode Island

References

Houses completed in 1895
Houses on the National Register of Historic Places in Rhode Island
Houses in Providence County, Rhode Island
Buildings and structures in Central Falls, Rhode Island
National Register of Historic Places in Providence County, Rhode Island
Historic district contributing properties in Rhode Island